San Basilio agli Orti Sallustiani (Saint Basil at the Horti Sallustiani) is a rectory church in Rome, on via Trevi in the Trevi district. It is dedicated to Saint Basil. The church is a secondary place of worship for the Parish of San Camillo de Lellis.

History
It was built by abbot Apolemone Agreste (Apollinare Agresta), whose coat of arms can be seen on the church's arches. It is sited next to a hospice of the Italo-Greco college of Basilian monks (the order founded by its patron saint) of Grottaferrata - they restored the church in 1682, as recorded by the inscription over its main entrance.

The church houses several inscriptions recording monks and priests of the college, including cardinal Basilios Bessarion, commendatory abbot of Grottaferrata, who was made a cardinal by pope Eugenius IV in 1439. The church and part of the college are still owned by the Italian Basilian Order of Grottaferrata, whilst the rest is owned by the Italian state.

Bibliography 

Additional sources
 C. Rendina, Le Chiese di Roma, Newton & Compton Editori, Milano 2000
 M. Quercioli, Rione IV Campo Marzio, in AA.VV, I rioni di Roma, Newton & Compton Editori, Milano 2000, Vol. I, pp. 264-334

 Eastern Catholic church buildings in Italy
17th-century Roman Catholic church buildings in Italy
Roman Catholic churches completed in 1682
1682 establishments in the Papal States
Churches of Rome (rione Trevi)